Sadadeen is a suburb of the town of Alice Springs, in the Northern Territory, Australia. 

It is named after Afghan cameleer Charlie Sadadeen.

References

Suburbs of Alice Springs